Arvid E. Gillstrom (13 August 1889 – 21 May 1935) was a film director and screenwriter from Sweden. He was born Arvid Evald Gyllström in Annedal, Gothenburg, Sweden. He married Ethel Burton in 1917. Gillstrom died in Hollywood, California.

Selected filmography

 Their Social Splash (1915)
 Back Stage (1917)
 The Hero (1917)
 Dough Nuts (1917)
 The Villain (1917)
 The Millionaire (1917)
 The Goat (1917)
 The Fly Cop (1917)
 The Chief Cook (1917)
 The Candy Kid (1917)
 The Hobo (1917)
 The Pest (1917)
 The Band Master (1917)
 The Slave (1917)
 The Stranger (1918)
 The Rogue (1918)
 His Day Out (1918)
 The Orderly (1918)
 The Scholar (1918)
 The Messenger (1918)
 Swat the Spy (1918)
 Tell It to the Marines (1918)
 Smiles (1919)
 Leave It to Gerry (1924)
 Legionnaires in Paris (1927)
 Melancholy Dame (1929)
 The Framing of the Shrew (1929)
 Please (1933)
 Just an Echo (1934)

References

External links

 
 

1889 births
1935 deaths
Swedish film directors
Swedish male screenwriters
20th-century Swedish screenwriters
20th-century Swedish male writers